Şefik Abalı (born 7 June 2002) is a professional footballer who plays as a centre-back for İskenderunspor. Born in Austria, he represents Turkey internationally.

Career
Abalı made his professional debut with Wacker Innsbruck II in a 1–1 Austrian 2. Liga tie with FC Liefering on 29 May 2019.

On 1 July 2021, he signed a four-year contract with Göztepe in Turkey. Seven days later, on 8 July 2021, he joined SKU Amstetten on loan, back in Austria.

Abalı signed a two-and-a-half-year contract with Eerste Divisie club Dordrecht on 31 January 2022. He made his debut for the club on 4 February, coming on as an injury-time substitute for Toine van Huizen in the 2–2 league draw against Almere City.

On 16 January 2023, Abalı moved to TFF Second League club İskenderunspor on a 2.5-year contract.

International career
Born in Austria, Abalı is of Turkish descent. He is a youth international for both Austria and Turkey. He was called up to represent the Turkey U21s on 17 March 2021.

References

External links
 
 
 OEFB Profile

2002 births
Living people
Sportspeople from Innsbruck
Footballers from Tyrol (state)
Turkish footballers
Turkey youth international footballers
Austrian footballers
Austria youth international footballers
Austrian people of Turkish descent
FC Wacker Innsbruck (2002) players
SKU Amstetten players
FC Dordrecht players
İskenderun FK footballers
2. Liga (Austria) players
Austrian Regionalliga players
Eerste Divisie players
Austrian expatriate footballers
Turkish expatriate footballers
Expatriate footballers in the Netherlands
Turkish expatriate sportspeople in the Netherlands
Austrian expatriate sportspeople in the Netherlands
Association football defenders
21st-century Turkish people